Gelophaula praecipitalis is a species of moth of the family Tortricidae. It is found in New Zealand.

The larvae have been recorded feeding on Celmisia lyallii.

References

Moths described in 1934
Archipini
Moths of New Zealand